Herbert Broennle (25 December 1920 – 4 July 1943) was a Luftwaffe ace and recipient of the Knight's Cross of the Iron Cross during World War II.  The Knight's Cross of the Iron Cross was awarded to recognise extreme battlefield bravery or successful military leadership.  Herbert Broennle was killed on 4 July 1943 when he was shot down and crashed north of Lake Lentini in Italy.  He was credited with 58 victories in 387 missions.

Awards
 Ehrenpokal der Luftwaffe (7 October 1941)
 Front Flying Clasp of the Luftwaffe in Gold
 Iron Cross (1939)
 2nd Class
 1st Class
 Wound Badge (1939)
 in Black
 German Cross in Gold on 15 June 1942 as Feldwebel in the I./Jagdgeschwader 54
 Knight's Cross of the Iron Cross on 14 March 1943 as Oberfeldwebel and pilot in the 4./Jagdgeschwader 54

Notes

References

Citations

Bibliography

External links
TracesOfWar.com
Ritterkreuztraeger 1939-1945
Aces of the Luftwaffe

1920 births
1943 deaths
Luftwaffe pilots
German World War II flying aces
Recipients of the Gold German Cross
Recipients of the Knight's Cross of the Iron Cross
Luftwaffe  personnel killed in World War II
Aviators killed by being shot down
Military personnel from Munich